Gerard Parkes (October 16, 1924 – October 19, 2014) was an Irish-Canadian actor. He was born in Dublin, and moved to Toronto in 1956. He is known for playing "Doc" on the Canadian Broadcasting Corporation television series Fraggle Rock and the bartender in the film The Boondock Saints and its sequel The Boondock Saints II: All Saints Day.

Career
His acting career spanned film, radio, television, and the stage. Parkes worked often on CBC radio, beginning in 1959, and shifted into television and film, acting in such diverse series as the 1960s' ecological adventure series The Forest Rangers, children's show The Littlest Hobo, and the detective series Cagney and Lacey. In 1968, Parkes won the first Canadian film award (then called the Etrog and now known as the Gemini) for his portrayal of Uncle Matthew in the movie Isabel. He received the Andrew Allan Award in 1983 for Best Radio Actor, and in 1999, he won the Dora Mavor Moore Award for Outstanding Performance in a Featured Role for Kilt.

He played the role of Wiff Roach in Mike Newell's 1976 television adaptation of David French's theatrical play Of the Fields, Lately.

Parkes played the role of Doc in the North American version of Fraggle Rock. When he was cast in Fraggle Rock, Parkes was finishing a regular role as another type of "doc," playing Dr. Arthur Lowe (no relation to the English actor of the same name) on the Canadian TV series Home Fires. After Fraggle Rock, in addition to returning as Doc in A Muppet Family Christmas, he continued to work in children's television, guest starring as alcoholic photographer Phil (opposite Sesame Park puppeteer Nina Keogh) on the TVOntario puppet series Today's Special, and appearing regularly on PBS's Shining Time Station as store owner Barton Winslow. In 1988 he made a cameo appearance in the hit comedy Short Circuit 2 as a priest, and in 1989 he appeared in The Last Winter as the protagonist's grandfather. In 1995 he also portrayed the priest at St Bart's in New York in the Olsen Twins movie It Takes Two.

In 1996, he portrayed Jonathan Swift in the HBO Original Film Handel's Last Chance. In 1998, he appeared on an episode of PBS's Noddy, as Wally the Wanderer in "Noah's Leaving". He appeared with Willem Dafoe and Billy Connolly in The Boondock Saints (playing a Tourette's syndrome-afflicted bartender, also named "Doc"). He reprised the role for The Boondock Saints II: All Saints Day.

He appeared in The Adjuster (1991), premiering at the New York Film Festival. In 1991, it won the Special Silver St. George at the 17th Moscow International Film Festival.   In 1993, the Toronto International Film Festival ranked the film 10th in the Top 10 Canadian Films of All Time.<ref>"Top 10 Canadian Films of All Time" , The Canadian Encyclopedia (2012; accessed 28 April 2013).</ref>

Death
He died on October 19, 2014, three days after his 90th birthday.

Honors and awards
 In 1968, Canadian Film Award for Best Actor.
 In 1999, Dora Mavor Moore Award for Outstanding Performance in a Featured Role for Kilt.

Sources
Greer, Sandy. "Small Screen", The Toronto Star'', August 2, 1986

References

External links

1924 births
2014 deaths
Canadian male television actors
Canadian male film actors
Canadian male voice actors
Fraggle Rock
Male actors from Dublin (city)
Irish emigrants to Canada
20th-century Canadian male actors
21st-century Canadian male actors
Best Actor Genie and Canadian Screen Award winners